Lee University is a private Christian university in Cleveland, Tennessee. It was originally the Church of God Bible Training School, a small Bible institute founded in 1918 with twelve students and one teacher, Nora I. Chambers. The school grew and became Lee College, with a Bible college and junior college on its current site, in 1948. Twenty years later, Lee received accreditation by the Southern Association of Colleges and Schools as a four-year liberal arts college. In 1997, Lee made the transition from college to comprehensive university. The university is divided into six colleges and schools: the College of Arts & Sciences, the Helen DeVos College of Education, the School of Business, the School of Music, the School of Nursing, and the School of Religion. The university also offers online degrees through the Division of Adult Learning. The university is named for F.J. Lee, its second president. 

In 2009, Voices of Lee, the a cappella vocal ensemble directed by Danny Murray, competed on the first season of The Sing-Off, an a capella competition television show on NBC, hosted by Nick Lachey; they finished in third place. In addition, several alumni have found success in popular television singing competitions. Phil Stacey finished in sixth place on season 6 of American Idol. In May 2015, Clark Beckham was runner-up on season 14 of American Idol, and in that same year, alumnus Jordan Smith won season nine of NBC's The Voice. In December 2017, Brooke Simpson placed third on the thirteenth season of The Voice. In January 2013, the Lee University Festival Choir, a special group composed of singers from each of the choral ensembles, performed at the inauguration of President Barack Obama in Washington, D.C.

History

Lee's enrollment is 5,370 students, up from 960 in 1986 (as of fall 2013). This makes Lee the fifth largest undergraduate enrollment among the 103 Christian colleges who are member institutions of the Council for Christian Colleges and Universities. Students currently represent all 50 states and more than 50 countries. On average, Lee also accepts more than 200 transfer students each fall.

Lee University prohibits homosexual relationships for students. The University filed an amicus brief in favor of employment discrimination against LGBT people in the court case Bostock v. Clayton County in 2019.

Presidents
 Ambrose Jessup Tomlinson (1918–1922) [Church of God General Overseer (1909–1923)]
 Flavius Josephus Lee (1922–1923) [Church of God General Overseer (1923–1928)]
 J.B. Ellis (1923–1924)
 T.S. Payne (1924–1930)
 J. Herbert Walker, Sr. (1930–1935) [Church of God General Overseer (1935–1944)]
 Zeno C. Tharp (1935–1944) [Church of God General Overseer (1952–1956)]
 J. Herbert Walker, Sr. (1944–1945)
 E.L. Simmons (1945–1948)
 J. Stewart Brinsfield (1948–1951)
 John C. Jernigan (1951–1952)
 R. Leonard Carroll, Sr. (1952–1957) [Church of God General Overseer (1970–1972)]
 R. L. Platt (1957–1960)
 Ray H. Hughes, Sr. (1960–1966) [Church of God General Overseer (1972–1974; 1978–1982; 1996)]
 James A. Cross (1966–1970) [Church of God General Overseer (1958–1962)]
 Charles W. Conn (1970–1982) [Church of God General Overseer (1966–1970)]
 Ray H. Hughes, Sr. (1982–1984)
 R. Lamar Vest (1984–1986) [Church of God General Overseer (1990–1994; 2000–2004)]
 Charles Paul Conn (1986–2020)
 Mark Walker (2020-current)

Academics

Academic programs
Many co-curricular activities, such as chapel attendance (offered twice per week; students are required to attend 70% of services a month), service requirements (10 hours per semester; 80 total hours to graduate), and the study abroad program, called Global Perspectives, are required as part of degree programs. Exceptions and special cases are approved by the relevant academic dean or the president of the university. All non-local entering freshmen are also required to live on campus, with exceptions made for those who are married, divorced, widowed, parents, over age 21, part-time, or living locally with immediate relatives.

Entering freshmen choose their courses of study with guidance of a faculty adviser. New freshmen and transfer students with under 16 credit hours are required to take a course called Gateway to University Success, a one-semester special topics seminar that stresses methods of inquiry, critical analysis, and writing skills, which helps to transition the student to college life. The course is taught by a full-time faculty member and a student Peer Leader. Included in the general education core of all degrees is an emphasis in biblical and theological study.

Lee offers 50 majors with over 100 individual programs. Communications, psychology, pre-medicine, business, elementary education, and music are considered among its strongest specialties.

Reputation
Lee is accredited by the Commission on Colleges of the Southern Association of Colleges and Schools to award baccalaureate and master's degrees. Professional and specialized accreditation have been achieved in the following areas: the School of Music is accredited by the National Association of Schools of Music, the Helen DeVos College of Education is accredited by the National Council for Accreditation of Teacher Education (NCATE), the School of Business is accredited by the Accreditation Council for Business Schools and Programs (ACBSP), the School of Nursing is accredited by the Commission on Collegiate Nursing Education (CCNE), and the athletic training program has national accreditation in the Commission on Accreditation of Athletic Training Education (CAATE).

Athletics

The Lee athletic teams are called the Flames. The university is a member of the Division II level of the National Collegiate Athletic Association (NCAA), primarily competing in the Gulf South Conference (GSC) since the 2013–14 academic year. They were also a member of the National Christian College Athletic Association (NCCAA), primarily competing as an independent in the Mid-East Region of the Division I level. The Flames previously competed in the Southern States Athletic Conference (SSAC; formerly known as Georgia–Alabama–Carolina Conference (GACC) until after the 2003–04 school year) of the National Association of Intercollegiate Athletics (NAIA) from 2004–05 to 2012–13.

Lee competes in 18 intercollegiate varsity sports: Men's sports include baseball, basketball, cheerleading, cross country, golf, soccer, tennis & track & field; while women's sports include basketball, cheerleading, cross country, golf, lacrosse, soccer, softball, tennis, track & field and volleyball. Club sports are offered such as boxing, men's and women's rugby, spikeball and ultimate frisbee.

Campus

Lee University is located in the town of Cleveland, Tennessee, which lies between Chattanooga and Knoxville. Cleveland is located near the Ocoee River, the site of the 1996 Summer Olympics whitewater events, the Smoky Mountains, and the popular Gatlinburg area.

This location had long been the site of church-affiliated schools.  Centenary College was founded in 1884 to honor the "centenary" of American Methodism. Located on part of the present campus, that school closed in 1929, and in 1933 its property was sold to Bob Jones College, an interdenominational college which had previously been in Florida. When that school moved to South Carolina in 1947, the property was once again sold, and the Church of God became its new owner with Lee College and now, Lee University occupying the original and much expanded area.

The  campus consists of academic buildings, residence halls, athletic and recreational facilities, dining services, administrative offices, parks and green spaces, a pedestrian mall, Campus Safety facilities, music performance spaces, and other facilities. Many building projects have been undertaken in recent years, including a new humanities center (2004), a new religion building (2008), a new state of the art science building (2009), a new chapel (2011), a new communications building (2014), a new School of Nursing building (2016), and a new School of Business (2017). The campus also features articulate landscaping and many benches and areas for students. The sidewalks are handicap accessible.

Campus buildings
Note: Dates of construction given when known

Residence halls
Atkins-Ellis Hall (1994) – female residence hall built after Ellis Hall fire
B.L. Hicks Hall (1996) – male apartment residence hall
Bowdle-O'Bannon Hall (2002) – male residence hall connected by an atrium
Brinsfield Row East (2003) – female apartments named after former president J. Stewart Brinsfield; expanded in 2004 and 2008
Brinsfield Row West (2003) – male apartments named after former president J. Stewart Brinsfield; expanded in 2004 and 2008
Carroll Court (1973) – married apartment residence hall named after former president R. Leonard Carroll
Cross Hall (1969) – female residence hall named after former president James A. Cross
Dirksen Row (2017) – female apartments named after former professors
Keeble Hall (1999) – female apartment residence hall
Livingston East (2011) – female townhouse residence hall
Livingston Hall (1995) – female apartment residence hall
Medlin Hall (1930s) – male residence hall (formerly Walker Hall and Memorial Hall) where Billy Graham lived during his time as a student when Bob Jones University owned the campus.
New Hughes Hall (2011) – female residence hall named in memory of former President Ray H. Hughes
Nora Chambers Hall (1930s)  – female residence hall connected to Simmons and Tharp Halls; renovated in 1994
Sharp-Davis Hall (1990) – female residence hall
Simmons Hall (1930s) – female residence hall connected to Nora Chambers Hall; renovated in 1981
Storms Hall (2000) – female apartment residence hall
Tharp Hall (1930s) – female residence hall connected to Nora Chambers; renovated in 1981

Other buildings
Admissions House – located in a historic house on Ocoee Street
Centenary Building – oldest building on campus, formerly women's dormitory East Wing Hall and Student Center, home to administrative offices in conjunction with the Higginbotham Administration Building
Pressley Maintenance Building (1987) – Physical Plant headquarters
School of Business (1997) – located on Central Avenue, renovated by Lee in 2018
Watkins Building – houses Center for Calling and Career and Counseling Center

Former buildings
Beach Science Building (1965) – demolished in 2009 to make way for new science building
Ellis Hall (1941) – destroyed by arson in November 1993
Hughes Hall (1968) – male residence hall named after former president Ray H. Hughes, demolished in 2010 to make way for the Math & Science Complex
Old Main – oldest building on campus before demolition in 1962

Social Activities

Community covenant
All students are asked to sign a "Community Covenant" which lists several restrictions on behaviors and social interaction according to the school's institutional and religious policy. Most notable are a substance policy barring alcohol, tobacco, and illegal drugs; and its stance on homosexuality, which is banned in all forms. Men's and women's dormitories are kept separate, and premarital sexual intercourse is prohibited regardless of sexual preference. Immodesty and "occult practices" are also forbidden.

Greek organizations
Like many colleges and universities in the U.S., Lee University students can participate in Greek organizations for the purpose of serving the community, bettering the campus and building social and professional relationships. Many of the Greek organizations on Lee University's campus are neither national nor recognized as fraternities or sororities, and are instead colloquially referred to as "Greek clubs." There are currently only two nationally affiliated social fraternities at Lee University, Phi Mu Alpha and Kappa Upsilon Chi. Sigma Alpha Omega is currently the only nationally affiliated sorority on campus.

Campus Events
Dorm Wars is a Res Life event that takes place annually in the Walker Arena. This event pits each dorm against the other in a series of mental and physical events. Each dorm is supporting their own charity and the winning residence halls receive a donation to the charity that they represent. The night begins with introduction dances and progresses into three activities. The first activity is a mystery relay race, the second is a shopping cart race, and the final event is the obstacle course.
Great Strides is an annual race that brings together students and community members to raise money for the Cystic Fibrosis Foundation (CFF). Great Strides is a national fundraiser and the largest fundraiser for the CFF.
Culture Fest is another annual event at Lee. This event is a celebration of culture, global connection, and student community. Cultures are celebrated with music and discussion. Different unions and councils are represented such as the Black Student Union, Asian Council, LUUSA, ISF, and the BCC.
Ask Your President Chapel normally occurs in the second semester where the university's president takes the stage and answers questions that the students submit weeks prior. President Paul Conn states that “Lee is a place where we listen to students.” During these chapels, Conn tends to make many changes that the students request.
Worthy Now is an event started by student leaders at Lee that focuses on women but also encourages men to participate. They strive to tell women they are not worthy when they achieve, but rather they are worthy now, hence the name. The name is derived from an idea by Brené Brown.

"Tunnels of Oppression"
In 2017, Lee University sponsored its annual "Tunnels of Oppression" event, whereby students were subjected to simulated acts of misogyny and racism so they could "recognize their own privilege."  Students were led on an interactive tour which "exposes them to a different type of oppression in each room", including sexual, racial, societal and mental oppression.

Publications

The Vindagua is Lee University's award-winning yearbook-turned-magazine. In 2017, former editor Cariann Bradley transitioned the publication from yearbook to lifestyle magazine after 75 years. The goal of the publication is to further connect with the student body and Cleveland community. President Paul Conn is a notable former editor.
The Torch is the university's quarterly magazine highlighting current events at Lee, as well as faculty members, students and alumni.
The Lee Clarion is the campus newspaper.
The Lee Review is the campus literary journal.
The Burgundy and Blue is an online news publication for alumni.

Notable alumni

Candace Barley – youngest player to compete on the US national rugby team and play in international match; most-capped U20 player in the country
Clark Beckham – runner-up of season 14 of American Idol
Kevin Brooks– mayor of Cleveland and former state representative for Tennessee district 24.
Nathan Chapman – Grammy award-winning record producer
Charles Paul Conn – president of Lee University (1986–2020) 
Charles W. Conn – former Lee president and president emeritus; author of Like a Mighty Army, Moves the Church of God, the official history of the Church of God (Cleveland, TN) denomination; served as editor-in-chief of Pathway Press and General Overseer of the Church of God
Christian A. Coomer – state representative from Georgia's 14th district, then judge of the Georgia Court of Appeals
Raymond Culpepper – former General Overseer of the Church of God
Jay DeMarcus – multi-instrumentalist/vocalist in the contemporary country band Rascal Flatts
Four Voices – 2002 world champion barbershop quartet
Mark Harris – contemporary Christian soloist and member of 4 Him
Dan Howell – member of the Tennessee House of Representatives.
Marcus Lamb - founder of Daystar Television Network
 Ben Lobb – Canadian politician (Conservative Member of Parliament)
Dr. J. Adam Lowe – Author and member of the Tennessee State Senate.
Micah Massey – tied Grammy winner for Best Contemporary Christian Music Song "Your Presence is Heaven" with Israel Houghton
G. Dennis McGuire – former General Overseer of the Church of God
Stanley Nyazamba – former Columbus Crew soccer player
Ricardo Pierre-Louis – former MLS soccer player drafted in the second round (22nd overall) in the 2008 MLS SuperDraft by the Columbus Crew of Major League Soccer
Barney Smith - museum curator
Brooke Simpson – finalist on season 13 of The Voice
Jordan Smith – winner of season 9 of The Voice
Phil Stacey – American Idol finalist during the sixth season; tied for fifth place
Scott Stapp – lead singer of the band Creed; kicked out of Lee for the use of marijuana (early 1990s)
Todd Starnes – Fox News columnist and radio host
Perry Stone (minister) – international evangelist and author
John Christopher Thomas – New Testament scholar, former President of the Society for Pentecostal Studies, editor of the Journal of Pentecostal Theology, author of eight books and many scholarly articles.
Lance Zawadzki – San Diego Padres 2007 draft pick, shortstop

References

External links

 
 
 Official athletics website

 
Private universities and colleges in Tennessee
Universities and colleges affiliated with the Church of God (Cleveland, Tennessee)
Educational institutions established in 1918
Cleveland, Tennessee
Universities and colleges accredited by the Southern Association of Colleges and Schools
Education in Bradley County, Tennessee
Buildings and structures in Bradley County, Tennessee
Evangelicalism in Tennessee
Council for Christian Colleges and Universities
1918 establishments in Tennessee
Pentecostalism in Tennessee